Roy Galley (born 8 December 1947) is a British Conservative Party politician. He served as MP for Halifax from 1983 to 1987.

Early life
Galley was educated at King Edward VII School, Sheffield followed by Worcester College, Oxford.

Political career
Having stood unsuccessfully for Dewsbury in 1979, he was elected as Member of Parliament for Halifax in the 1983 general election. He ousted from Westminster the re-selected Labour candidate, Dr Shirley Summerskill. As in many seats the win, by 1,869	votes, 3.4%, was due a swing from Labour to the SDP, and when that vote fell in the 1987 general election, he was defeated by Labour's Alice Mahon.

Whilst in Parliament he was Secretary of the Conservative Backbench Health Committee and a member of the Social services Select Committee. He also introduced a private member's Bill on Local Government to restrict the ability of local authorities to increase local taxes by more than the rate of inflation.

After Parliament
After losing the 1987 election, he returned to Royal Mail where he held a series of senior management jobs. From 1994 to 1996, he was Director of Restructuring for Royal Mail London when he implemented a plan to close 4 Mail centres in order to improve operational efficiency and introduce new working practices. In 1998 he was appointed as Head of Strategic Planning for Post Office Group Property. In 2006 he retired from Royal Mail.

He was  Chairman of Kingston & Esher Health Authority, then Kingston & Richmond Health Authority from 1989 to 1998. He was also Chairman of the Kingston & St. George's College of Health Studies from 1993 to 1996.

In 2007 he was elected a member of Wealden District Council, East Sussex. He co-led on its Planning and Development policy and oversight from 2008 to 2013, followed by Economic Development and Regeneration.

In 2013 he was elected as a member of East Sussex County Council and sits on a range of committees.

Notes

External links 
 

1947 births
Living people
Conservative Party (UK) MPs for English constituencies
People educated at King Edward VII School, Sheffield
Alumni of Worcester College, Oxford
UK MPs 1983–1987